The Miles Davis Collection, Vol. 1: 12 Sides of Miles is a compilation album by American jazz musician Miles Davis, released in 1981 by Columbia Records.

Track listing 
"Concierto De Aranjuez" [from Sketches of Spain] – 16:19 	
"Will O' The Wisp" [from Sketches of Spain] – 3:50	
"The Pan Piper" [from Sketches of Spain] – 3:53 	
"Saeta" [from Sketches of Spain] – 5:08 	
"Solea" [from Sketches of Spain] – 12:14 	
"Springsville" [from Miles Ahead] – 3:24 	
"The Maids Of Cadiz" [from Miles Ahead] – 4:01 	
"The Duke" [from Miles Ahead] – 3:33 	
"My Ship" [from Miles Ahead] – 4:20 	
"Miles Ahead" [from Miles Ahead] – 3:32 	
"Blues For Pablo" [from Miles Ahead] – 5:15 	
"New Rhumba" [from Miles Ahead] – 4:44 	
"The Meaning Of The Blues" [from Miles Ahead] – 2:40 	
"Lament" [from Miles Ahead] – 2:23 	
"I Don't Wanna Be Kissed (By Anyone But You)" [from Miles Ahead] – 3:04 	
"Buzzard Song" [from Porgy and Bess] – 4:04 	
"Bess, You Is My Woman Now" [from Porgy and Bess] – 5:09 	
"Gone" [from Porgy and Bess] – 3:37 	
"Gone, Gone, Gone" [from Porgy and Bess] – 2:01 	
"Summertime" [from Porgy and Bess] – 3:13 	
"Oh Bess, Oh Where's My Bess" [from Porgy and Bess] – 4:27 	
"Prayer (Oh Doctor Jesus)" [from Porgy and Bess] – 4:36 	
"Fisherman, Strawberry And Devil Crab" [from Porgy and Bess] – 4:00 	
"My Man's Gone Now" [from Porgy and Bess] – 6:17 	
"It Ain't Necessarily So" [from Porgy and Bess] – 4:22 	
"Here Come De Honey Man" [from Porgy and Bess] – 1:17 	
"I Loves You, Porgy" [from Porgy and Bess] – 3:34 	
"There's A Boat That's Leaving Soon For New York" [from Porgy and Bess] – 3:24 	
"So What" [from Kind of Blue] – 8:55 	
"Freddie Freeloader" [from Kind of Blue] – 9:30 	
"Blue In Green" [from Kind of Blue] – 5:25 	
"All Blues" [from Kind of Blue] – 11:35 	
"Flamenco Sketches" [from Kind of Blue] – 9:25 	
"Pharaoh's Dance" [from Bitches Brew] – 20:07 	
"Bitches Brew" [from Bitches Brew] – 27:00 	
"Spanish Key" [from Bitches Brew] – 17:30 	
"John Mclaughlin" [from Bitches Brew] – 4:23 	
"Miles Runs The Voodoo Down" [from Bitches Brew] – 14:03 	
"Sanctuary" [from Bitches Brew] – 10:54

Charts

References

External links

2006 albums
Miles Davis compilation albums
Columbia Records compilation albums